Larry or Lawrence Black(e) may refer to:

Larry Black (sprinter) (1951–2006), American sprinter
Larry Black (American football) (born 1989), American football player
Lawrence Black (1881–1959), English cricketer
Lawrence Black (historian), English historian
Lawrence Black, character in The City of Trembling Leaves
Lawrence Blacke, candidate in Massachusetts general election, 1978